Go! Go! G-Boys is a 2006 Taiwanese comedy film directed by Yu Jongjong. The film stars Sattawat Sethakorn as A-Hong, Zheng Gangtang as A-Shing and Yu Fayang as Jay. It was released on September 6, 2006.

Plot
The G-Boys is a male beauty contest held annually in the city of Taipei for gay men, with a main prize of US$10 million. Among the participants is A-Hong, whose selfish and wasteful girlfriend accumulates a large debt that he is forced to pay. Looking for a way to make money, A-Hong decides to enter the G-Boys contest despite not being gay, while being joined by his best friend A-Shing (Zheng Gangtang). A-Shing dreams of becoming a rock star and has been secretly in love with A-Hong since childhood; he finds in the contest a possibility of becoming more than friends. However, the contest is under a series of death threats that has alerted the police. Jay, a somewhat homophobic detective and an enthusiastic fan of action movies, is sent to infiltrate in the contest and discover the culprit.

Cast
Sattawat Sethakorn as A-Hong
Zheng Gangtang as A-Shing
Yu Fayang as Jay
Chen Aoliang as Young Long
Tang Guojung as Daniel
Lai Tzyi como Kitamura
Peng Poshao as Siao Shi
Juang Shinfu as Alex 
Josephine Blankstein as Risa
Teddy Wang as Terrorist
Renzo Liu as Contest organizer

References

External links

2006 films
Films set in Taiwan
Gay-related films
Taiwanese LGBT-related films
2006 romantic comedy films
LGBT-related romantic comedy films
2006 drama films
2006 LGBT-related films
Taiwanese romantic comedy films